The Pugang gas field is a natural gas field located in Sichuan. It was discovered in 2006 and developed by and China National Petroleum Corporation. It began production in 2007 and produces natural gas and condensates. The total proven reserves of the Pugang gas field are around 12.46 trillion cubic feet (356 km³), and production is slated to be around 1 billion cubic feet/day (35×105m³).

References

Natural gas fields in China